or  is a lake in Narvik Municipality in Nordland county, Norway. The  lake is located between the lake Børsvatnet and the lake Melkevatnet.

See also
List of lakes in Norway

References

Ballangen
Lakes of Nordland